Palla decius, the white-banded palla, is a butterfly in the family Nymphalidae. It is found in Senegal, Guinea, Sierra Leone, Liberia, Ivory Coast, Ghana, Nigeria, Cameroon, the Republic of the Congo, the western part of the Democratic Republic of the Congo and northern Angola. The habitat consists of lowland evergreen forests.

The larvae feed on Calycobolus africanus, Bonomia poranoides and Clerodendron buchholzii.

References

Butterflies described in 1777
Charaxinae